Bhopal railway division is one of the three railway divisions falling under West Central Railway zone (WCR) of Indian Railways. This railway division was formed on 1st April 1952 and its Headquarters are located at Rani Kamalapati, Bhopal in the state of Madhya Pradesh of India.

Jabalpur railway division and Kota railway division being the other two. WCR Zone is headquartered at Jabalpur.

Geographical jurisdiction
The Bhopal division extends to Khandwa Junction (Excluding) in the south and Bina Junction (including) in the north on the Mumbai-Delhi main line route. Its branch lines extend from Bina Junction (excluding) to Maxi Junction (excluding) via Guna Junction and: from Guna Junction to Kota Junction (excluding) and from Guna Junction to Gwalior Junction (excluding).

Number of Lines (tracks) on each route
The section between Khandwa junction to Etarsi junction is a double line section. Section between Etarsi junction to Bhopal junction is also a double line section at present but the work of provision of third line is in progress. Bhopal junction to Bina junction section is a three line section. The branch line sections Bina-Guna, Guna-Kota and Guna-Maxi are presently single line sections where the work of provision of second line is in progress. Guna-Gwalior branch line is a single line section.

List of railway stations and towns 
The list includes the stations under the Bhopal railway division and their station category.

Stations closed for Passengers - Harsud, Singaji, Piplani

See also
Bhopal Division on Twitter

References

 
Divisions of Indian Railways
1952 establishments in India